The Guild of Boston Artists (The Guild) was founded in 1914 by a handful of Boston artists working in the academic and realist traditions.  Among the founding members were Frank Weston Benson, William McGregor Paxton and Edmund C. Tarbell, who served as its first president through 1924.  The organization holds exhibitions of its members' work several times a year as well as numerous one-person shows.  Founded with the intention to promote the highest standards of quality, The Guild also hosts programs and competitions.

History
The Guild of Boston Artists, a non-profit art organization, was founded in 1914 to "promote, nurture and encourage traditional art while adhering to the highest standards of quality and presentation."  Founding members included Edmund C. Tarbell, William McGregor Paxton, Lilla Cabot Perry, Frank Weston Benson, Bela Pratt, Charles Herbert Woodbury, Ignaz Gaugengigl, and Gertrude Fiske.

Boston artists found it difficult to have their work exhibited outside of the local area.  In response, seven area artists formed The Guild of Boston Artists.  Modeled after the historic guilds of Europe, the organization held high professional standards in a supportive environment.  In their Newberry Gallery, annual shows of works of all members were interspersed with two-week one-man shows that highlighted the work of individual artists.

In 1916 the Museum of Fine Arts, Boston temporarily put paintings from two of their galleries into storage to make room for a one-month exhibition of works of "some of the best work being done in Boston" by Guild members.  Previously unsuccessful in garnering enough work of Boston artists for an exhibition, the museum was pleased both with the quality of works made available for the exhibition and the inclusiveness of Guild membership.

Works of early women members of the guild, including Laura Coombs Hills, Lilian Westcott Hale, Alice Ruggles Sohier, Lucy May Stanton, Mary Foote Hawley, Elizabeth Okie Paxton and Agnes Abbott, were exhibited in the 2001 retrospective show "A Woman's Perspective: Founding and Early Women Members of the Guild of Boston Artists, 1914–1945."

Guild presidents
The presidents of the Guild include:

Membership
Over 60 artists from New England are currently represented by the gallery, covering a wide range of media and genres.

There are currently three forms of membership: Associate, Student and Patron memberships. Members are provided the opportunity to receive a discount for Guild classes workshops, and critiques and invitations to private events and special previews. Associate and student members are also able to submit work for juried exhibitions and are exempt from fees for selected juried exhibitions.

Exhibitions and programs
Each year The Guild hosts painting exhibitions of its members.  Ongoing displays of varying genres and media are displayed in the upper gallery.  The President's Gallery is used for one-person shows and themed exhibits. The Guild offers educational programs for its artists, including classes, workshops, lectures and critiques. Juried competitions for Guild members are held in April and non-members in October each year.

The Guild's building is located at 162 Newberry Street in the gallery district of Boston.

Gallery
The gallery contains works of some of the guild's members.

See also
 The Boston School of painting

Notes

References
 Bedford, Faith Andrews, The Sporting Art of Frank W. Benson, David R. Godine, Jaffrey, NH, 2000. .
 The Guild of Boston Artists (official site), Retrieved June 13, 2011.
 The Guild of Boston Artists, The Art Guide, (2011). Retrieved June 13, 2011.
 Museum of Fine Arts, Boston. (April 1916) Boston Museum bulletin. Volume 14. Retrieved June 15, 2011.

External links
 The Guild of Boston Artists (official website) 
 The Guild of Boston Artists Exhibition, Art Institute of Chicago, 1916 Catalog

Guild
Arts organizations based in Massachusetts
Guild
Arts organizations established in the 1910s
1914 establishments in Massachusetts